Ciara is a popular Irish language female name and was tenth on the list of most popular names given to baby girls in Ireland in 2006. It is the feminine version of the name Ciarán, meaning "dark-haired", and was also the name of Saint Ciara, a seventh-century Irish saint venerated by the Roman Catholic Church. The name is often anglicized as Keira, Kiara, or Kiera.

People
 Ciara Baxendale (born 1995), British actress
 Ciara Bravo (born 1997), American actress, pronounced "Sierra"
 Ciara Considine, a musician known for her Celtic and folk music
 Ciara Conway (born 1980), Irish Labour Party politician, Teachta Dála (TD) for Waterford from 2011 to 2016
 Ciara Gaynor, a camogie player
 Ciara Gibson-Byrne (born 1992), British water polo player
 Ciara Grant (footballer, born 1978) 
 Ciara Grant (footballer, born 1993) 
 Ciara Hanna (born 1991), American actress and model
 Ciara (born 1985), singer Ciara Harris, pronounced "Sierra"
 Ciara Horne (born 1989), British racing cyclist
 Ciara Janson (born 1987), English actress
 Ciara Kelly, Irish journalist and broadcaster
 Ciara Lucey, Irish camogie player
 Ciara McAvoy, poster artist
 Ciara McCormack (born 1979), a Canadian–born Irish female soccer defender
 Ciara Michel (born 1985), British volleyball player
 Ciara Newell, an original member of Irish girl group Bellefire
 Ciara O'Connor, Irish camogie player
 Ciara Peelo (born 1979), Irish sailor
 Ciara Renée (born 1990), American actress
 Ciara Sotto (born 1980), Filipina actress and singer (pronounced as "sha-ra")
 Ciara Storey, Irish camogie player
 Ciara Whelan, Irish television presenter

Fictional characters
Ciara Brady
Ciara (on the TV show Lost Girl)
 Ciara Porter (The Cuckoo's Calling)

See also

Chara (given name)
Kiara
Keira (given name)
Chiara
List of Irish-language given names

Notes

Irish-language feminine given names